Jeannin is a French surname. Notable people with the surname include:

Alex Jeannin (born 1977), French footballer
Pierre Jeannin (1540–1622), French politician and diplomat
Sandy Jeannin (born 1976), Swiss ice hockey player

French-language surnames